Rekoa bourkei, the Jamaican hairstreak or Hispaniolan hairstreak, is a butterfly in the family Lycaenidae. It is found in the Dominican Republic, Jamaica and Trinidad.

References

Butterflies described in 1925
Eumaeini